Cherokee County Regional Airport  is a county-owned public-use airport in Cherokee County, Georgia, United States. It is located six nautical miles (7 mi, 11 km) northeast of the central business district of Canton, Georgia. The airport is adjacent to Interstate 575, about halfway between the city of Canton and the city of Ball Ground. 

Although most U.S. airports use the same three-letter location identifier for the FAA and IATA, this airport is assigned CNI by the FAA but has no designation from the IATA (which assigned CNI to Changhai Airport in the People's Republic of China).  It was previously 47A when it was known as the Cherokee County Airport, prior to improvements made in the 2010s.

The new facilities will accommodate 200 hangared corporate aircraft and provide 100 tie-downs for smaller aircraft.

Facilities and aircraft 
It has one runway designated 5/23 with an asphalt surface measuring 5,002 by 75 feet (1,525 × 23 m).

For the 12-month period ending July 2, 2011, the airport had 24,000 general aviation aircraft operations, an average of 65 per day. At that time there were 88 aircraft based at this airport: 78.4% single-engine, 15% multi-engine, 1% jet, 3% helicopter, and 2% ultralight.

It has a non-directional beacon (callsign WRLB3306) on AM longwave 416 kHz, which identifies itself with DJD in Morse code tones, then announces the name twice, followed by "automated altimeter", and the local sea-level pressure in inches of mercury (such as "two-niner-niner-five" for 29.95).

References

External links 
 Aerial photo as of 1 January 1993 from USGS The National Map
 
 
 

Airports in Georgia (U.S. state)
Buildings and structures in Cherokee County, Georgia
Transportation in Cherokee County, Georgia